"Put Your Hand in Mine" is a song written by Skip Ewing and Jimmy Wayne (under his birth name, Jimmy Wayne Barber), and recorded by American country music singer Tracy Byrd.   It was released in September 1999 as the first single from his album It's About Time.  It peaked at number 11 on the Hot Country Singles & Tracks (now Hot Country Songs) chart.

Content
The song is a ballad mostly accompanied by piano. In the first verse, the narrator packs all of his stuff to leave his wife. His son gives him a drawing of his hand and a refrigerator magnet, and tells him that if he needs him, the father can put his hand in his son's.

In the second verse of the song, the narrator drives past a church. After looking at his son's drawing, he goes into the church to pray. In the third verse, the narrator says that he was unable to sleep because he is thinking about her. He then tells her, "If you're not too tired / And it's not too late / Put your hand in mine".

Chart positions
"Put Your Hand in Mine" spent twenty-five weeks on the Hot Country Singles & Tracks charts, peaking at number 11 in early 2000. It also served as the b-side to the album's second single, "Love, You Ain't Seen the Last of Me," as well as the b-side of Byrd's 2001 single "A Good Way to Get on My Bad Side."

Year-end charts

References

External links
Lyrics at CMT.com

1999 singles
1999 songs
Tracy Byrd songs
Songs written by Skip Ewing
Song recordings produced by Billy Joe Walker Jr.
RCA Records Nashville singles
Songs written by Jimmy Wayne